Judge Hamilton may refer to:

Clyde H. Hamilton (1934–2020), judge of the United States Court of Appeals for the Fourth Circuit
David Hamilton (judge) (born 1957), judge of the United States Court of Appeals for the Seventh Circuit
Elwood Hamilton (1883–1945), judge of the United States Court of Appeals for the Sixth Circuit
Jean Constance Hamilton (born 1945), judge of the United States District Court for the Eastern District of Missouri
Peter J. Hamilton (1859–1927), judge of the United States District Court for the District of Puerto Rico
Phyllis J. Hamilton (born 1952), judge of the United States District Court for the Northern District of California

See also
Justice Hamilton (disambiguation)